Ninh Hòa station (Vietnamese: Ga Ninh Hòa) is a railway station on North–South railway. It is located in Ninh Hòa, Khánh Hòa province, Vietnam.

There is both passenger and freight service at the station. Passenger pick-up was temporarily suspended in July 2021 to deal with epidemic control related to Covid-19.

References 

Railway stations in Hanoi